Laura Janeth Acuña Ayala is a Colombian lawyer, television presenter, and model. She was the presenter of the Muy Buenos Días magazine of RCN Televisión and presenter of the RCN Show of Noticias RCN in the 5:30 a.m. broadcast.  In 2021, she participated in the musical program La Voz Kids on Caracol Televisión.

Early life and education
She completed her high school studies at the Nuestra Señora del Pilar de Bucaramanga Educational Institution, once she graduated, she began her law studies at the Autonomous University of Bucaramanga. her to dedicate herself to modeling and presenting in programs of the regional channel Televisión Regional del Oriente. Upon moving to Bogotá, she was hired by RCN Televisión to host Fuera de lugar and Muy buenos días. In 2018 she completed her studies and graduated as a lawyer.

In 2006, Laura Acuña separated from Camilo Montoya, after less than two years of marriage. Soon after, she began a relationship with the music producer José Gaviria.

Filmography

Presenter

Cinema

References

Living people
1982 births
Colombian women lawyers
21st-century Colombian lawyers
21st-century women lawyers
Colombian female models
Colombian television presenters
Colombian women television presenters
Autonomous University of Bucaramanga people
People from Santander Department